Lasioglossum clarum, also known as the Lasioglossum (Ctenomia) clarum, is a species of bee in the genus Lasioglossum, of the family Halictidae.

References

External links
 Bees of Sri Lanka

clarum
Insects described in 1902